Ushakovo is the name of several rural localities in Russia.

Amur Oblast
As of 2012, one rural locality in Amur Oblast bears this name:
Ushakovo, Amur Oblast, a selo in Ushakovsky Rural Settlement of Shimanovsky District

Republic of Bashkortostan
As of 2012, one rural locality in the Republic of Bashkortostan bears this name:
Ushakovo, Republic of Bashkortostan, a village in Nikolayevsky Selsoviet of Ufimsky District

Belgorod Oblast
As of 2012, one rural locality in Belgorod Oblast bears this name:
Ushakovo, Belgorod Oblast, a selo in Korochansky District

Ivanovo Oblast
As of 2012, two rural localities in Ivanovo Oblast bear this name:
Ushakovo, Rodnikovsky District, Ivanovo Oblast, a village in Rodnikovsky District
Ushakovo, Teykovsky District, Ivanovo Oblast, a village in Teykovsky District

Kaliningrad Oblast
As of 2012, four rural localities in Kaliningrad Oblast bear this name:
Ushakovo, Chernyakhovsky District, Kaliningrad Oblast, a settlement in Svobodnensky Rural Okrug of Chernyakhovsky District
Ushakovo, Nizovsky Rural Okrug, Guryevsky District, Kaliningrad Oblast, a settlement in Nizovsky Rural Okrug of Guryevsky District
Ushakovo, Novomoskovsky Rural Okrug, Guryevsky District, Kaliningrad Oblast, a settlement in Novomoskovsky Rural Okrug of Guryevsky District
Ushakovo, Ozyorsky District, Kaliningrad Oblast, a settlement under the administrative jurisdiction of the Town of District Significance of Ozyorsk in Ozyorsky District

Kaluga Oblast
As of 2012, one rural locality in Kaluga Oblast bears this name:
Ushakovo, Kaluga Oblast, a village in Maloyaroslavetsky District

Kemerovo Oblast
As of 2012, one rural locality in Kemerovo Oblast bears this name:
Ushakovo, Kemerovo Oblast, a village in Kalinkinskaya Rural Territory of Promyshlennovsky District;

Kirov Oblast
As of 2012, three rural localities in Kirov Oblast bear this name:
Ushakovo, Kiknursky District, Kirov Oblast, a village in Vashtrangsky Rural Okrug of Kiknursky District; 
Ushakovo, Luzsky District, Kirov Oblast, a village under the administrative jurisdiction of Lalsk Urban-Type Settlement in Luzsky District; 
Ushakovo, Verkhnekamsky District, Kirov Oblast, a village in Loynsky Rural Okrug of Verkhnekamsky District;

Kostroma Oblast
As of 2012, three rural localities in Kostroma Oblast bear this name:
Ushakovo, Buysky District, Kostroma Oblast, a selo in Tsentralnoye Settlement of Buysky District; 
Ushakovo, Nerekhtsky District, Kostroma Oblast, a selo in Volzhskoye Settlement of Nerekhtsky District; 
Ushakovo, Oktyabrsky District, Kostroma Oblast, a village in Pokrovskoye Settlement of Oktyabrsky District;

Kurgan Oblast
As of 2012, one rural locality in Kurgan Oblast bears this name:
Ushakovo, Kurgan Oblast, a village in Peschansky Selsoviet of Shchuchansky District

Kursk Oblast
As of 2012, two rural localities in Kursk Oblast bear this name:
Ushakovo, Fatezhsky District, Kursk Oblast, a village in Bolshezhirovsky Selsoviet of Fatezhsky District
Ushakovo, Kursky District, Kursk Oblast, a village in Shchetinsky Selsoviet of Kursky District

Leningrad Oblast
As of 2012, one rural locality in Leningrad Oblast bears this name:
Ushakovo, Leningrad Oblast, a village in Shugozerskoye Settlement Municipal Formation of Tikhvinsky District

Mari El Republic
As of 2012, one rural locality in the Mari El Republic bears this name:
Ushakovo, Mari El Republic, a village in Karakshinsky Rural Okrug of Orshansky District

Moscow Oblast
As of 2012, one rural locality in Moscow Oblast bears this name:
Ushakovo, Moscow Oblast, a village in Osheykinskoye Rural Settlement of Lotoshinsky District

Nizhny Novgorod Oblast
As of 2012, three rural localities in Nizhny Novgorod Oblast bear this name:
Ushakovo, Aleshkovsky Selsoviet, Bogorodsky District, Nizhny Novgorod Oblast, a village in Aleshkovsky Selsoviet of Bogorodsky District
Ushakovo, Kamensky Selsoviet, Bogorodsky District, Nizhny Novgorod Oblast, a village in Kamensky Selsoviet of Bogorodsky District
Ushakovo, Gaginsky District, Nizhny Novgorod Oblast, a selo in Ushakovsky Selsoviet of Gaginsky District

Novgorod Oblast
As of 2012, two rural localities in Novgorod Oblast bear this name:
Ushakovo, Borovichsky District, Novgorod Oblast, a village in Travkovskoye Settlement of Borovichsky District
Ushakovo, Lyubytinsky District, Novgorod Oblast, a village under the administrative jurisdiction of the Settlement of Nebolchskoye in Lyubytinsky District

Omsk Oblast
As of 2012, one rural locality in Omsk Oblast bears this name:
Ushakovo, Omsk Oblast, a selo in Ushakovsky Rural Okrug of Muromtsevsky District

Oryol Oblast
As of 2012, one rural locality in Oryol Oblast bears this name:
Ushakovo, Oryol Oblast, a selo in Ushakovsky Selsoviet of Kolpnyansky District

Pskov Oblast
As of 2012, one rural locality in Pskov Oblast bears this name:
Ushakovo, Pskov Oblast, a village in Nevelsky District

Ryazan Oblast
As of 2012, one rural locality in Ryazan Oblast bears this name:
Ushakovo, Ryazan Oblast, a selo in Sobchakovsky Rural Okrug of Spassky District

Smolensk Oblast
As of 2012, two rural localities in Smolensk Oblast bear this name:
Ushakovo, Dorogobuzhsky District, Smolensk Oblast, a village in Ushakovskoye Rural Settlement of Dorogobuzhsky District
Ushakovo, Yelninsky District, Smolensk Oblast, a village in Rozhdestvenskoye Rural Settlement of Yelninsky District

Tula Oblast
As of 2012, three rural localities in Tula Oblast bear this name:
Ushakovo, Uzlovsky District, Tula Oblast, a village in Lyutoricheskaya Rural Administration of Uzlovsky District
Ushakovo, Yasnogorsky District, Tula Oblast, a village in Znamenskaya Rural Territory of Yasnogorsky District
Ushakovo, Yefremovsky District, Tula Oblast, a selo in Shkilevsky Rural Okrug of Yefremovsky District

Tver Oblast
As of 2012, five rural localities in Tver Oblast bear this name:
Ushakovo, Bezhetsky District, Tver Oblast, a village in Shishkovskoye Rural Settlement of Bezhetsky District
Ushakovo, Staritsky District, Tver Oblast, a village in Stepurinskoye Rural Settlement of Staritsky District
Ushakovo, Torzhoksky District, Tver Oblast, a village in Budovskoye Rural Settlement of Torzhoksky District
Ushakovo, Udomelsky District, Tver Oblast, a village in Brusovskoye Rural Settlement of Udomelsky District
Ushakovo, Vesyegonsky District, Tver Oblast, a village in Proninskoye Rural Settlement of Vesyegonsky District

Tyumen Oblast
As of 2012, one rural locality in Tyumen Oblast bears this name:
Ushakovo, Tyumen Oblast, a selo in Ushakovsky Rural Okrug of Vagaysky District

Vladimir Oblast
As of 2012, one rural locality in Vladimir Oblast bears this name:
Ushakovo, Vladimir Oblast, a village in Sudogodsky District

Vologda Oblast
As of 2012, seven rural localities in Vologda Oblast bear this name:
Ushakovo, Chagodoshchensky District, Vologda Oblast, a village in Pervomaysky Selsoviet of Chagodoshchensky District
Ushakovo, Gryazovetsky District, Vologda Oblast, a village in Anokhinsky Selsoviet of Gryazovetsky District
Ushakovo, Kichmengsko-Gorodetsky District, Vologda Oblast, a village in Kichmengsky Selsoviet of Kichmengsko-Gorodetsky District
Ushakovo, Mezhdurechensky District, Vologda Oblast, a village in Botanovsky Selsoviet of Mezhdurechensky District
Ushakovo, Ust-Kubinsky District, Vologda Oblast, a village in Filisovsky Selsoviet of Ust-Kubinsky District
Ushakovo, Ivanovsky Selsoviet, Vashkinsky District, Vologda Oblast, a village in Ivanovsky Selsoviet of Vashkinsky District
Ushakovo, Piksimovsky Selsoviet, Vashkinsky District, Vologda Oblast, a village in Piksimovsky Selsoviet of Vashkinsky District

Yaroslavl Oblast
As of 2012, nine rural localities in Yaroslavl Oblast bear this name:
Ushakovo, Bolsheselsky District, Yaroslavl Oblast, a village in Bolsheselsky Rural Okrug of Bolsheselsky District
Ushakovo, Nekouzsky District, Yaroslavl Oblast, a village in Stanilovsky Rural Okrug of Nekouzsky District
Ushakovo, Pervomaysky District, Yaroslavl Oblast, a village in Semenovsky Rural Okrug of Pervomaysky District
Ushakovo, Rostovsky District, Yaroslavl Oblast, a village in Novo-Nikolsky Rural Okrug of Rostovsky District
Ushakovo, Rybinsky District, Yaroslavl Oblast, a village in Arefinsky Rural Okrug of Rybinsky District
Ushakovo, Tutayevsky District, Yaroslavl Oblast, a village in Borisoglebsky Rural Okrug of Tutayevsky District
Ushakovo, Uglichsky District, Yaroslavl Oblast, a village in Ninorovsky Rural Okrug of Uglichsky District
Ushakovo, Lyutovsky Rural Okrug, Yaroslavsky District, Yaroslavl Oblast, a village in Lyutovsky Rural Okrug of Yaroslavsky District
Ushakovo, Tochishchensky Rural Okrug, Yaroslavsky District, Yaroslavl Oblast, a selo in Tochishchensky Rural Okrug of Yaroslavsky District